Basil C. Lucas (born c. 1879) was a rugby union player who represented Australia.

Lucas, a flanker, was born in Brisbane, Queensland and claimed one international rugby cap for Australia, playing against New Zealand, at Dunedin, on 2 September 1905.

References

Australian rugby union players
Australia international rugby union players
Year of birth uncertain
Year of death missing
Rugby union flankers
Rugby union players from Brisbane